Straßenbahnhaltestelle / Tramstop / Fermata del Tram, 1961–1976, A Monument to the Future (the complete title) is a work of installation art by the German artist Joseph Beuys. Beuys originally created this installation for the German pavilion at the 37th Venice Biennale in 1976. Today two copies of the work exist, one in the Kröller-Müller Museum, Otterlo, and another in the Hamburger Bahnhof, Berlin. The work is based upon Beuys' childhood memories of a tram stop in Kleve on Nassauer Allee. The installation consists of a long, rusty length of rail, four sections of broad, rusty pipe, and a cannon of the early modern type. The cannon is topped by a cast iron head with a sorrowful expression. These elements are laid parallel to one another on the ground.

References 
All of these references are in German.

 Joseph Beuys: Strassenbahnhaltestelle, Ein Monument für die Zukunft, Museum Kurhaus Kleve, Kleve 2000 (B.O.S.S. Verlag), 
 Heiner Bastian (Hrsg.): Joseph Beuys. Skulpturen und Objekte, Munich 1988 (Schirmer/Mosel), 
 Freundeskreis Museum Kurhaus und Koekkoek-Haus Kleve e.V. (Hrsg.): Joseph Beuys. ‚Straßenbahnhaltestelle‘. Ein Monument für die Zukunft, Kleve 2000, 
Guido de Weerd (Foreword): Fritz Getlinger. Joseph Beuys und die ‚Straßenbahnhaltestelle‘, Museum Kurhaus Kleve, Kleve 2000, 

Installation art works
1976 sculptures
Works by Joseph Beuys